Empire City, or simply Empire, is a town in Stephens County, Oklahoma, United States. The population was 955 at the 2010 census.

History
A classic oil-boom town, Empire City started in the late 1910s as drilling activity in Stephens County mushroomed.  At its peak, its estimated population was about 3000.   The original post office was established in February 1921 and discontinued in December 1934.   With the boom long gone, the population by 1980 dwindled to just 13 persons.   But the town started a rebound in the mid-1980's.   While no post office has been reestablished, the 2010 census counted 955 inhabitants.

Geography
Empire City is located at  (34.463922, -98.038008).

Demographics

As of the census of 2010, there were 955 people living in the town. There were 369 housing units at an average density of 26.8 per square mile (10.3/km2). The racial makeup of the town was 94.82% White, 0.14% African American, 3.13% Native American, 0.14% Asian, 0.68% from other races, and 1.09% from two or more races. Hispanic or Latino of any race were 2.18% of the population.

There were 266 households, out of which 41.0% had children under the age of 18 living with them, 77.8% were married couples living together, 3.8% had a female householder with no husband present, and 13.5% were non-families. 11.7% of all households were made up of individuals, and 4.5% had someone living alone who was 65 years of age or older. The average household size was 2.76 and the average family size was 2.98.

In the town, the population was spread out, with 27.1% under the age of 18, 6.8% from 18 to 24, 24.9% from 25 to 44, 30.1% from 45 to 64, and 11.0% who were 65 years of age or older. The median age was 40 years. For every 100 females, there were 107.9 males. For every 100 females age 18 and over, there were 101.9 males.

The median income for a household in the town was $39,722, and the median income for a family was $43,304. Males had a median income of $34,844 versus $23,750 for females. The per capita income for the town was $17,190. About 4.9% of families and 6.4% of the population were below the poverty line, including 5.8% of those under age 18 and 6.7% of those age 65 or over.

References

External links
 Encyclopedia of Oklahoma History and Culture - Empire City

Towns in Stephens County, Oklahoma
Towns in Oklahoma